Yürekli can refer to the following places in Turkey:

 Yürekli, Elazığ, a village in Elazığ Province
 Yürekli, Çayırlı
 Yürekli, İvrindi